Salman Baig (born 7 May 1989) is an Indian first-class cricketer who plays for Madhya Pradesh. He made his List A debut on 27 February 2014, for Madhya Pradesh in the 2013–14 Vijay Hazare Trophy.

References

External links
 

1989 births
Living people
Indian cricketers
Madhya Pradesh cricketers
Cricketers from Bhopal